Word of mouth is a method of communication.

Word of Mouth may also refer to:

Word of Mouth (TV series), a TV show hosted by Sandy Daza and Teacher Patty in the Philippines
Word of Mouth (DVD), a stand-up DVD by Doug Stanhope
Word of Mouth (radio programme), a BBC Radio 4 programme presented by Michael Rosen
Word of Mouth (journal), a peer-reviewed academic journal in the field of education

In music:
Word of Mouth (Toni Basil album), 1982
Word of Mouth (The Blueskins album), 2004
Word of Mouth (Matt Finish album), 1984
Word of Mouth (Vin Garbutt album), 1999
Word of Mouth (The Kinks album), 1984
"Word of Mouth" (The Kinks song), 1984
Word of Mouth (Mike + The Mechanics album), 1991
"Word of Mouth" (Mike + The Mechanics song), 1991
Word of Mouth (Jaco Pastorius album), 1981
Word of Mouth (John Reuben album), 2007
Word of Mouth (Vicious Rumors album), 1994
Word of Mouth (The Wanted album), 2013

See also
Word-of-mouth marketing (aka WOMM), a method of marketing that deliberately employs word of mouth
Word of Mouf, a 2001 album by Ludacris